The Carnival of Venice (Italian: Il carnevale di Venezia) is a 1939 Italian comedy film directed by Giuseppe Adami and Giacomo Gentilomo and starring Cesco Baseggio, Toti Dal Monte and Junie Astor. It was made at the Cinecittà studios in Rome.

Cast
 Cesco Baseggio as Momolo  
 Toti Dal Monte as Ninetta, sua figlia  
 Junie Astor as Tonina  
 Guido Lazzarini as Paolo Sagredo  
 Stefano Sibaldi as Marchetto Zanzi, il fornaio  
 Greta Gonda as Margherita 
 Alessandra Adari as Una impiega della manifattura dei tabacchi  
 Armando Annuale as Il vecchietto curioso  
 Doris Cafioro
 Andreina Carli as L'amica snob di Paolo  
 Rudi Dal Pra 
 Loredana as Una impiega della manifattura dei tabacchi 
 Carmen Mauti 
 Amalia Pellegrini as La vecchietta curiosa

References

Bibliography
 Luciano De Giusti. Giacomo Gentilomo, cineasta popolare. Kaplan, 2008.

External links

1939 films
1930s Italian-language films
Films directed by Giacomo Gentilomo
Italian comedy films
1939 comedy films
Films set in Venice
Films shot at Cinecittà Studios
Italian black-and-white films
1930s Italian films